Colson Kade Montgomery (born February 27, 2002) is an American professional baseball shortstop in the Chicago White Sox organization.

Amateur career
Montgomery was raised in Holland, Indiana, and attended Southridge High School in Huntingburg, Indiana, where he played football, basketball, and baseball. He began his high school career being recruited mainly for basketball by schools such as Purdue University and the University of Louisville before shifting his focus to baseball. In 2018, his freshman year, he hit .387 with 33 RBIs. As a sophomore, he averaged 21.1 points per game on the basketball court. He is the all-time leading scorer in Southridge basketball history with 1,966 career points. 

As a junior, Montgomery committed to play college baseball at Indiana University. He also would have been a preferred walk-on for the Indiana Hoosiers men's basketball team. In 2021, his senior baseball season, he batted .333 with seven home runs, 23 RBIs, and 24 stolen bases, and led Southridge to their first ever IHSAA state championship. Following the end of the season, he traveled to Cary, North Carolina, where he participated in MLB's first ever Draft Combine.

Professional career
Montgomery was selected by the Chicago White Sox in the first round with the 22nd overall selection of the 2021 Major League Baseball draft. He signed with the White Sox for a $3 million signing bonus. He made his professional debut with the Rookie-level Arizona Complex League White Sox. Over 104 at-bats in 26 games, Montgomery slashed .287/.396/.362 with seven doubles and seven RBIs. He was assigned to the Kannapolis Cannon Ballers of the Single-A Carolina League to begin the 2022 season. He was promoted to the Winston-Salem Dash of the High-A South Atlantic League in late June. Montgomery was promoted once again in mid-August to the Birmingham Barons of the Double-A Southern League. Over 96 games between the three teams, he slashed .274/.381/.429 with 11 home runs, 47 RBIs, and 17 doubles.

References

External links

2002 births
Living people
Baseball shortstops
Baseball players from Indiana
Arizona Complex League White Sox players
Kannapolis Cannon Ballers players
Winston-Salem Dash players
Birmingham Barons players